Samland may refer to:
 Sambia Peninsula
 Bishopric of Samland
 Samland District (Landkreis Samland), East Prussia
 SS Samland, see SS Belgic
 Corps Task Force Samland of XXVIII Army Corps (Wehrmacht)
 Andreas Samland